The Yalu River, known by Koreans as the Amrok River or Amnok River, is a river on the border between China and North Korea. Together with the Tumen River to its east, and a small portion of Paektu Mountain, the Yalu forms the border between China and North Korea. Its valley became the scene of several military conflicts in the past centuries.

Name
The Korean name Amnok (압록,鴨綠) is most likely derived from ancient Koreanic language of Goguryeo. In the record of Goguryeo in Samguk Sagi, the place name, Western Amnok valley (서압록곡,西鴨淥谷) appears, and this is an example of indicating that this was originally a place name used for this river by Goguryeo at that time.

There are two theories regarding the origin of Yalu river name. One theory is that the name derived from Yalu ula in the Manchu language. The Manchu word yalu means "the boundary between two countries". In Mandarin Chinese,  phonetically approximates the original Manchu word, but literally means "duck green", which was said to have been once the color of the river. The other theory is that the river was named after the combination of its two upper branches, which were called "" ( or Ap) and "" ( or R(or n)ok)", respectively.

Revised Romanization of Korean spelled it  ("Amnok River") and Revised Romanization of Hangeul spelled it  ("Aprok River").

Geography
From 2,500 metres above sea level on Paektu Mountain on the China–North Korea border, the river flows south to Hyesan before sweeping 130 km north-west to Linjiang and then returning to a more southerly route for a further 300 km to empty into Korea Bay between Dandong (China) and Sinuiju (North Korea). The bordering Chinese provinces are Jilin and Liaoning.

The Yalu's most significant tributaries are the Changjin, the Hochon, the Togro rivers from Korea and the Ai (or Aihe)  and the Hun from China. The river is not easily navigable for most of its length. Most of the river freezes during winter and can be crossed on foot.

The depth of the Yalu River varies from some of the more shallow parts on the eastern side in Hyesan to the deeper parts of the river near the Yellow Sea. The estuary is the site of the Amrok River estuary Important Bird Area, identified as such by BirdLife International.

About 205 islands are on the Yalu. A 1962 border treaty between North Korea and China split the islands according to which ethnic group was living on each island. North Korea possesses 127 and China 78. Due to the division criteria, some islands such as Hwanggumpyong Island belong to North Korea, but abut the Chinese side of the river.

History

The river basin is the site where Goguryeo rose to power. Many former fortresses are located along the river and the former capital of that kingdom was situated at what is now the medium-sized city of Ji'an along the Yalu, a site rich in Goguryeo era relics.
Wihwa Island on the river is historically famous as the place where, in 1388, General Yi Songgye (later Taejo of Joseon) decided to turn back his army southward to Kaesong in the first of a series of revolts that eventually led to the establishment of the Joseon dynasty.

The river has been the site of several battles because of its strategic location between Korea and China, including:

 Battle of the Yalu River (1894) – First Sino-Japanese War
 Battle of Yalu River (1904) – Russo-Japanese War
 Battle near to the Yalu River (1950) – Korean War

The southern side of the river was heavily industrialized during the period of Japanese rule (1910–1945), and by 1945 almost 20% of Japan's total industrial output originated in Korea.

During the Korean War, the movement of United Nations troops approaching the river precipitated massive Chinese intervention from around Dandong. In the course of the conflict every bridge across the river except one was destroyed. The one remaining bridge was the Sino-Korean Friendship Bridge connecting Sinuiju, North Korea to Dandong, China. During the war the valley surrounding the western end of the river also became the focal point of a series of dogfights for air supremacy over North Korea, earning the nickname "MiG Alley" in reference to the MiG-15 fighters flown by the combined North Korean, Chinese, and Soviet forces. As UN forces during the Korean War advanced toward the Yalu, China under Chairman Mao Zedong entered the war on the side of North Korea.

The river has frequently been crossed by North Koreans fleeing to China since the early 1990s, although the Tumen River remains the most-used way for such refugees.

According to one scholar, the Korean-Chinese border along the Yalu River is the longest unchanged international border in history, lasting for at least 1,000 years.

Economy

The river is important for hydroelectric power, and one of the largest hydroelectric dams in Asia is in Sup'ung Dam, 106 metres high and over 850 metres long, located upstream from Sinuiju, North Korea. The dam has created an artificial lake over a portion of the river, called Supung Lake. In addition, the river is used for transportation, particularly of lumber from its forested banks. The river provides fish for the local population. Downstream of Sup'ung is the Taipingwan Dam. Upstream of Sup'ung is the Unbong Dam. Both dams produce hydroelectric power, as well.

In the river delta upstream from Dandong and adjacent to Hushan are several North Korean villages. Economic conditions in these villages have been described as poor, without access to electricity.

Crossings
 Ji'an Yalu River Border Railway Bridge, Ji'an China – Manp'o, North Korea
 New Yalu River Bridge, under construction between Dandong, China and Sinŭiju, North Korea
 Sino-Korean Friendship Bridge, Dandong, China – Sinŭiju, North Korea

See also
 China–North Korea border
 Geography of China
 Geography of North Korea
 List of rivers of Asia

References

External links

 Encyclopædia Britannica
 

 
Border rivers
China–North Korea border
Dandong
International rivers of Asia
Rivers of Jilin
Rivers of Liaoning
Rivers of North Korea